The Battle of Rajovka took place on September 20, 1708 near Rajovka during the Swedish invasion of Russia in the Great Northern War. The Swedish army of about 2,400 men under the command of Charles XII defeated the Russian army of 10,000 men under Christian Felix Bauer after a fierce cavalry skirmish where the king himself was in great danger. 

After having fought the battle of Malatitze the victorious Swedish army marched towards Tatarsk in order to fight the Russians under tsar Peter I. However, after a while a great number of Russian horse were spotted, having stalked the Swedish units. Charles immediately put himself in charge of the Östgöta kavalleriregemente to persecute the fleeing Russians. Unknown to the Swedes, a great number of other Russian horse were concealed behind some small woods near the exposed Russian cavalry in order to ambush Charles and his Östgöta cavalry who were running straight into the trap. For the moment, the Swedes had less than 1,000 men against close to 10,000 Russians and Charles' small squadron was quickly surrounded. The Swedes fought valiantly and Charles got his horse shot dead under him, however, they managed to halt the Russian attacks long enough for further Swedish reinforcements to arrive in form of Norra Skånska kavalleriregemente and Smålands kavalleriregemente and so all the Russians were pushed back with a loss of about 375 men killed. The Swedish losses were 100 men killed.

References

Conflicts in 1708
1708 in Europe
Rajovka 1708
Rajovka 1708
Rajovka 1708
Rajovka 1708
History of Smolensk Oblast